Clouds Over Hellesta (Swedish: Moln över Hellesta) is a 1954 Swedish thriller novel by Margit Söderholm. A young woman arrives at her future husband's country estate, and is disturbed by the mysterious death of his first wife.

Film adaptation
In 1956 it was made into the film Moon Over Hellesta directed by  Rolf Husberg and starring  Anita Björk.

References

Bibliography
 Goble, Alan. The Complete Index to Literary Sources in Film. Walter de Gruyter, 1999.
 Gaster, Adrian. The International Authors and Writers Who's Who. International Biographical Centre, 1977.

1954 Swedish novels
Swedish novels adapted into films
Swedish thriller novels
Novels by Margit Söderholm